Sara Giraudeau (born 1 August 1985) is a French actress. She won the 2018 César Award for Best Supporting Actress.

Life
Sara Giraudeau is the daughter of Anny Duperey and Bernard Giraudeau. She has a brother named Gaël.

Theatre

Filmography

References

External links

 

French film actresses
1985 births
Living people
21st-century French actresses
French stage actresses
French television actresses